The Hejaz Corps or Hejaz Group of the Ottoman Empire (Turkish: Hicaz Kolordusu) was one of the corps of the Ottoman Army. It was formed during World War I.

Formations

Order of Battle, January, June 1918 
In January, June 1918, the corps was structured as follows:

Hejaz Corps ('Asir)
58th Division
Provisional Infantry Divisions x 3

Sources

Corps of the Ottoman Empire
Military units and formations of the Ottoman Empire in World War I
Ottoman Arabia
1916 establishments in the Ottoman Empire
Arab Revolt